Albert Martin Robert Radecke (31 October 1830 – 21 June 1911; aged 80) was a German composer and conductor.

Biography
He was born in Dittmannsdorf, in Silesia, and received his musical training in the Conservatory of Leipzig. In 1853 he became musical director of the Court Theatre of Leipzig. He moved to Berlin soon after, played second violin in Ferdinand Laub's quartet, and gave many successful concerts. He was made royal Kapellmeister in 1871, and in 1891 succeeded Haupt as director of the Royal Institute for Church Music.

His older brother Rudolf (1829–1893) was also a composer.

Works
An artist of ability on pianoforte, organ, and violin, Radecke is best known for his compositions, which include two orchestral overtures, König Johann and Am Strande; the operetta Die Mönchguter (premiered 1874); and, above all, for his many songs, including the often-republished "folksong" "Aus der Jugendzeit" from his opus 22 set, to a text by Friedrich Rückert.

Notes

References

External links
 

List of works by Robert Radecke (IMSLP)

1830 births
1911 deaths
German classical composers
German male classical composers
19th-century German musicians
19th-century German male musicians
People from Wałbrzych County